A Fazenda 1 (formerly known as A Fazenda) was the first season of the Brazilian reality television series A Fazenda which premiered May 31, 2009 with the finale airing on August 23, 2009 on the RecordTV. The show was presented by news reporter Britto Júnior along with actress Chris Couto and directed by Rodrigo Carelli.

The winner was 28-year-old actor Dado Dolabella from Rio de Janeiro, Rio de Janeiro who defeated singer Danni Carlos with 83% of the votes.

Production

Cast
There were fourteen celebrity contestants competing for the grand prize, which was R$1,000,000 without tax allowances. The season lasted 85 days, making this the shortest season until A Fazenda 8.

Contestants
Below is biographical information according to the Record official site, plus footnoted additions.(ages stated are correct at the start of the contest)

Future appearances
In 2011, Franciely Freduzeski was contender to be a competitor on A Fazenda 4, but ultimately did not return.

In 2017, Théo Becker appeared in Dancing Brasil 2, he finished in 9th place in the competition.

In 2017, Fábio Arruda returned to compete in A Fazenda 9, he finished in 14th place in the competition.

Voting history

Notes
 : The first Farmer of the Week (Dado) was chosen by the public through an online vote.
 : Bárbara and Franciely were tied with 4 votes each. First nominee  Luciele, the first nominee, had the casting vote and chose to nominate Franciely.
 : Luciele and Miro were tied with 3 votes each. First nominee Danni had the casting vote and chose to nominate Miro.
 : Luciele and Mirella were tied with 2 votes each. First nominee Carlinhos had the casting vote and chose to nominate Luciele.
 : Danni and Fabiana were tied with 2 votes each. First nominee Jonathan had the casting vote and chose to nominate Danni.
 : Dado and Fabiana were tied with 2 votes each. First nominee Danni had the casting vote and chose to nominate Fabiana.
 : Carlinhos and Dado were tied with 2 votes each. First nominee Danielle had the casting vote and chose to nominate Dado.
 : Carlinhos won the final challenge and won immunity. Therefore, Dado, Danni and Pedro were automatically nominated.
 : The final three contestants were automatically nominated for the final eviction.
 : For the final, the public votes for the contestant they want to win A Fazenda 1.

References

External links
 Official Site 

A Fazenda
2009 Brazilian television seasons